Sir Sean Connery (born Thomas Connery; 25 August 1930 – 31 October 2020) was a Scottish actor. He was the first actor to portray fictional British secret agent James Bond on film, starring in seven Bond films between 1962 and 1983. Originating the role in Dr. No, Connery played Bond in six of Eon Productions' entries and made his final Bond appearance in the non-Eon-produced Never Say Never Again; if non-Eon-produced Bond movies are included, Connery shares the record for the most portrayals as James Bond with Roger Moore (with 7 apiece). Following his third appearance as Bond in Goldfinger (1964), in June 1965 Time magazine observed "James Bond has developed into the biggest mass-cult hero of the decade".

Connery began acting in smaller theatre and television productions until his break-out role as Bond. Although he did not enjoy the off-screen attention the role gave him, the success of the Bond films brought Connery offers from notable directors such as Alfred Hitchcock, Sidney Lumet and John Huston. Their films in which Connery appeared included Marnie (1964), The Hill (1965), Murder on the Orient Express (1974), and The Man Who Would Be King (1975). He also appeared in A Bridge Too Far (1977), Highlander (1986), The Name of the Rose (1986), The Untouchables (1987), Indiana Jones and the Last Crusade (1989), The Hunt for Red October (1990), Dragonheart (1996), The Rock (1996), Finding Forrester (2000), and The League of Extraordinary Gentlemen (2003). Connery officially retired from acting in 2006, although he briefly returned for voice-over roles in 2012.

His achievements in film were recognised with an Academy Award, two BAFTA Awards (including the BAFTA Fellowship), and three Golden Globes, including the Cecil B. DeMille Award and a Henrietta Award. In 1987, he was made a Commander of the Order of Arts and Letters in France, and he received the US Kennedy Center Honors lifetime achievement award in 1999. Connery was knighted in the 2000 New Year Honours for services to film drama.

Early life 

Thomas Connery was born at the Royal Maternity Hospital in Edinburgh, Scotland, on 25 August 1930; he was named after his paternal grandfather. He was brought up at No. 176 Fountainbridge, a block which has since been demolished. His mother, Euphemia McBain "Effie" McLean, was a cleaning woman. She was born the daughter of Neil McLean and Helen Forbes Ross, and named after her father's mother, Euphemia McBain, wife of John McLean and daughter of William McBain from Ceres in Fife. Connery's father, Joseph Connery, was a factory worker and lorry driver.

Two of his paternal great-grandparents emigrated to Scotland from Wexford, Ireland in the mid-19th century, with his great-grandfather James Connery being an Irish Traveller. The remainder of his family was of Scottish descent, and his maternal great-grandparents were native Scottish Gaelic speakers from Fife and Uig on Skye. His father was a Roman Catholic, and his mother was a Protestant. Connery had a younger brother Neil and was generally referred to in his youth as "Tommy". Connery was known during his teen years as "Big Tam", and he said that he lost his virginity to an adult woman in an ATS uniform at the age of 14. He had an Irish childhood friend named Séamus; when the two were together, those who knew them both called Connery by his middle name Sean, emphasising the alliteration of the two names. Since then Connery preferred to use his middle name.

Connery's first job was as a milkman in Edinburgh with St. Cuthbert's Co-operative Society. In 2009, Connery recalled a conversation in a taxi:

In 1946, at the age of 16, Connery joined the Royal Navy, during which time he acquired two tattoos.  Connery's official website says "unlike many tattoos, his were not frivolous – his tattoos reflect two of his lifelong commitments: his family and Scotland. ... One tattoo is a tribute to his parents and reads 'Mum and Dad', and the other is self-explanatory, 'Scotland Forever'". He trained in Portsmouth at the naval gunnery school and in an anti-aircraft crew. He was later assigned as an Able Seaman on HMS Formidable. Connery was discharged from the navy at the age of 19 on medical grounds because of a duodenal ulcer, a condition that affected most of the males in previous generations of his family.

Afterwards, he returned to the co-op and worked as a lorry driver, a lifeguard at Portobello swimming baths, a labourer, an artist's model for the Edinburgh College of Art, and after a suggestion by former Mr. Scotland Archie Brennan, as a coffin polisher, among other jobs. The modelling earned him 15 shillings an hour. Artist Richard Demarco, at the time a student who painted several early pictures of Connery, described him as "very straight, slightly shy, too, too beautiful for words, a virtual Adonis".

Connery began bodybuilding at the age of 18, and from 1951 trained heavily with Ellington, a former gym instructor in the British Army. While his official website states he was third in the 1950 Mr. Universe contest, most sources place him in the 1953 competition, either third in the Junior class or failing to place in the Tall Man classification. Connery said he was soon deterred from bodybuilding when he found that Americans frequently beat him in competitions because of sheer muscle size and, unlike Connery, refused to participate in athletic activity which could make them lose muscle mass.

Connery was a keen footballer, having played for Bonnyrigg Rose in his younger days. He was offered a trial with East Fife. While on tour with South Pacific, Connery played in a football match against a local team that Matt Busby, manager of Manchester United, happened to be scouting. According to reports, Busby was impressed with his physical prowess and offered Connery a contract worth £25 a week immediately after the game. Connery said he was tempted to accept, but he recalls, "I realised that a top-class footballer could be over the hill by the age of 30, and I was already 23. I decided to become an actor and it turned out to be one of my more intelligent moves".

Career

Early career 
Seeking to supplement his income, Connery helped out backstage at the King's Theatre in late 1951. During a bodybuilding competition held in London in 1953, one of the competitors mentioned that auditions were being held for a production of South Pacific, and Connery landed a small part as one of the Seabees chorus boys. By the time the production reached Edinburgh, he had been given the part of Marine Cpl. Hamilton Steeves and was understudying two of the juvenile leads, and his salary was raised from £12 to £14–10s a week. The production returned the following year, out of popular demand, and Connery was promoted to the featured role of Lieutenant Buzz Adams, which Larry Hagman had portrayed in the West End.

While in Edinburgh, Connery was targeted by the Valdor gang, one of the most violent in the city. He was first approached by them in a billiard hall where he prevented them from stealing his jacket and was later followed by six gang members to a 15-foot-high (4.6 m) balcony at the Palais de Danse. There, Connery singlehandedly launched an attack against the gang members, grabbing one by the throat and another by the biceps and cracking their heads together. From then on, he was treated with great respect by the gang and gained a reputation as a "hard man".

Connery first met Michael Caine at a party during the production of South Pacific in 1954, and the two later became close friends. During this production at the Opera House, Manchester, over the Christmas period of 1954, Connery developed a serious interest in the theatre through American actor Robert Henderson who lent him copies of the Ibsen works Hedda Gabler, The Wild Duck, and When We Dead Awaken, and later listed works by the likes of Proust, Tolstoy, Turgenev, Bernard Shaw, Joyce, and Shakespeare for him to digest. Henderson urged him to take elocution lessons and got him parts at the Maida Vale Theatre in London. He had already begun a film career, having been an extra in Herbert Wilcox's 1954 musical Lilacs in the Spring alongside Errol Flynn and Anna Neagle.

Although Connery had secured several roles as an extra, he was struggling to make ends meet and was forced to accept a part-time job as a babysitter for journalist Peter Noble and his actress wife Marianne, which earned him 10 shillings a night. He met Hollywood actress Shelley Winters one night at Noble's house, who described Connery as "one of the tallest and most charming and masculine Scotsmen" she'd ever seen, and later spent many evenings with the Connery brothers drinking beer. Around this time, Connery was residing at TV presenter Llew Gardner's house. Henderson landed Connery a role in a £6 a week Q Theatre production of Agatha Christie's Witness for the Prosecution, during which he met and became friends with fellow-Scot Ian Bannen. This role was followed by Point of Departure and A Witch in Time at Kew, a role as Pentheus opposite Yvonne Mitchell in The Bacchae at the Oxford Playhouse, and a role opposite Jill Bennett in Eugene O'Neill's play Anna Christie.

During his time at the Oxford Theatre, Connery won a brief part as a boxer in the TV series The Square Ring, before being spotted by Canadian director Alvin Rakoff, who gave him multiple roles in The Condemned, shot on location in Dover in Kent. In 1956, Connery appeared in the theatrical production of Epitaph, and played a minor role as a hoodlum in the "Ladies of the Manor" episode of the BBC Television police series Dixon of Dock Green. This was followed by small television parts in Sailor of Fortune and The Jack Benny Program (on a special episode filmed in Europe).

In early 1957, Connery hired agent Richard Hatton who got him his first film role, as Spike, a minor gangster with a speech impediment in Montgomery Tully's No Road Back alongside Skip Homeier, Paul Carpenter, Patricia Dainton, and Norman Wooland. In April 1957, Rakoffafter being disappointed by Jack Palancedecided to give the young actor his first chance in a leading role, and cast Connery as Mountain McLintock in BBC Television's production of Requiem for a Heavyweight, which also starred Warren Mitchell and Jacqueline Hill. He then played a rogue lorry driver, Johnny Yates, in Cy Endfield's Hell Drivers (1957) alongside Stanley Baker, Herbert Lom, Peggy Cummins, and Patrick McGoohan. Later in 1957, Connery appeared in Terence Young's poorly received MGM action picture Action of the Tiger opposite Van Johnson, Martine Carol, Herbert Lom, and Gustavo Rojo; the film was shot on location in southern Spain. He also had a minor role in Gerald Thomas's thriller Time Lock (1957) as a welder, appearing alongside Robert Beatty, Lee Patterson, Betty McDowall, and Vincent Winter; this commenced filming on 1 December 1956 at Beaconsfield Studios.

Connery had a major role in the melodrama Another Time, Another Place (1958) as a British reporter named Mark Trevor, caught in a love affair opposite Lana Turner and Barry Sullivan. During filming, Turner's possessive gangster boyfriend, Johnny Stompanato, who was visiting from Los Angeles, believed she was having an affair with Connery. Connery and Turner had attended West End shows and London restaurants together. Stompanato stormed onto the film set and pointed a gun at Connery, only to have Connery disarm him and knock him flat on his back. Stompanato was banned from the set. Two Scotland Yard detectives advised Stompanato to leave and escorted him to the airport, where he boarded a plane back to the United States. Connery later recounted that he had to lay low for a while after receiving threats from men linked to Stompanato's boss, Mickey Cohen.

In 1959, Connery landed a leading role in director Robert Stevenson's Walt Disney Productions film Darby O'Gill and the Little People (1959) alongside Albert Sharpe, Janet Munro, and Jimmy O'Dea. The film is a tale about a wily Irishman and his battle of wits with leprechauns. Upon the film's initial release, A. H. Weiler of The New York Times praised the cast (save Connery whom he described as "merely tall, dark, and handsome") and thought the film an "overpoweringly charming concoction of standard Gaelic tall stories, fantasy and romance". He also had prominent television roles in Rudolph Cartier's 1961 productions of Adventure Story and Anna Karenina for BBC Television, the latter of which he co-starred with Claire Bloom. Also in 1961 he portrayed the title role in a CBC television film adaptation of Shakespeare's Macbeth with Australian actress Zoe Caldwell cast as Lady Macbeth.

James Bond: 1962–1971, 1983 

Connery's breakthrough came in the role of British secret agent James Bond. He was reluctant to commit to a film series, but understood that if the films succeeded, his career would greatly benefit. Between 1962 and 1967, Connery played 007 in Dr. No, From Russia with Love, Goldfinger, Thunderball, and You Only Live Twice, the first five Bond films produced by Eon Productions. After departing from the role, Connery returned for the seventh film, Diamonds Are Forever, in 1971. Connery made his final appearance as Bond in Never Say Never Again, a 1983 remake of Thunderball produced by Jack Schwartzman's Taliafilm. All seven films were commercially successful. James Bond, as portrayed by Connery, was selected as the third-greatest hero in cinema history by the American Film Institute.

Connery's selection for the role of James Bond owed a lot to Dana Broccoli, wife of producer Albert "Cubby" Broccoli, who is reputed to have been instrumental in persuading her husband that Connery was the right man. James Bond's creator, Ian Fleming, originally doubted Connery's casting, saying, "He's not what I envisioned of James Bond looks," and "I'm looking for Commander Bond and not an overgrown stunt-man", adding that Connery (muscular, 6'2", and a Scot) was unrefined. Fleming's girlfriend Blanche Blackwell told him Connery had the requisite sexual charisma, and Fleming changed his mind after the successful Dr. No première. He was so impressed, he wrote Connery's heritage into the character. In his 1964 novel You Only Live Twice, Fleming wrote that Bond's father was Scottish and from Glencoe in the Scottish Highlands.

Connery's portrayal of Bond owes much to stylistic tutelage from director Terence Young, who helped polish him while using his physical grace and presence for the action. Lois Maxwell, who played Miss Moneypenny, related that "Terence took Sean under his wing. He took him to dinner, showed him how to walk, how to talk, even how to eat". The tutoring was successful; Connery received thousands of fan letters a week after Dr. No's opening, and he became a major sex symbol in film.

Following the release of the film Dr. No in 1962, the line "Bond ... James Bond", became a catch phrase in the lexicon of Western popular culture. Film critic Peter Bradshaw writes, "It is the most famous self-introduction from any character in movie history. Three cool monosyllables, surname first, a little curtly, as befits a former naval commander. And then, as if in afterthought, the first name, followed by the surname again. Connery carried it off with icily disdainful style, in full evening dress with a cigarette hanging from his lips. The introduction was a kind of challenge, or seduction, invariably addressed to an enemy. In the early 60s, Connery's James Bond was about as dangerous and sexy as it got on screen".

During the filming of Thunderball in 1965, Connery's life was in danger in the sequence with the sharks in Emilio Largo's pool. He had been concerned about this threat when he read the script. Connery insisted that Ken Adam build a special Plexiglas partition inside the pool, but this was not a fixed structure, and one of the sharks managed to pass through it. He had to abandon the pool immediately.

Beyond Bond 

Although Bond had made him a star, Connery grew tired of the role and the pressure the franchise put on him, saying "[I am] fed up to here with the whole Bond bit" and "I have always hated that damned James Bond. I'd like to kill him". Michael Caine said of the situation, "If you were his friend in these early days you didn't raise the subject of Bond. He was, and is, a much better actor than just playing James Bond, but he became synonymous with Bond. He'd be walking down the street and people would say, 'Look, there's James Bond'. That was particularly upsetting to him".

While making the Bond films, Connery also starred in other films such as Alfred Hitchcock's Marnie (1964) and Sidney Lumet's The Hill (1965), which film critic Peter Bradshaw regards as his two great non-Bond pictures from the 1960s. In Marnie, Connery starred opposite Tippi Hedren. Connery had said he wanted to work with Hitchcock, which Eon arranged through their contacts. Connery also shocked many people at the time by asking to see a script, something he did because he was worried about being typecast as a spy and he did not want to do a variation of North by Northwest or Notorious. When told by Hitchcock's agent that Cary Grant had not asked to see even one of Hitchcock's scripts, Connery replied: "I'm not Cary Grant". Hitchcock and Connery got on well during filming, and Connery said he was happy with the film "with certain reservations". In The Hill, Connery wanted to act in something that wasn't Bond related, and he used his leverage as a star to feature in it. While the film wasn't a financial success it was a critical one, debuting at the Cannes Film Festival winning Best Screenplay. The first of five films he made with Lumet, Connery considered him to be one of his favourite directors. The respect was mutual, with Lumet saying of Connery's performance in The Hill, "The thing that was apparent to me – and to most directors – was how much talent and ability it takes to play that kind of character who is based on charm and magnetism. It's the equivalent of high comedy and he did it brilliantly."

In the mid-1960s, Connery played golf with Scottish industrialist Iain Maxwell Stewart, a connection which led to Connery directing and presenting the documentary film The Bowler and the Bunnet in 1967. The film described the Fairfield Experiment, a new approach to industrial relations carried out at the Fairfield Shipbuilding and Engineering Company, Glasgow, during the 1960s; the experiment was initiated by Stewart and supported by George Brown, the First Secretary in Harold Wilson's cabinet, in 1966. The company was facing closure, and Brown agreed to provide £1 million (£13.135 million; US$15.55 million in 2021 terms) to enable trade unions, the management and the shareholders to try out new ways of industrial management.

Having played Bond six times, Connery's global popularity was such that he shared a Golden Globe Henrietta Award with Charles Bronson for "World Film FavoriteMale" in 1972. He appeared in John Huston's The Man Who Would Be King (1975) opposite Michael Caine. Playing two former British soldiers who set themselves up as kings in Kafiristan, both actors regarded it as their favourite film. The same year, he appeared in The Wind and the Lion opposite Candice Bergen who played Eden Pedecaris (based on the real-life Perdicaris incident), and in 1976 played Robin Hood in Robin and Marian opposite Audrey Hepburn, who played Maid Marian. Film critic Roger Ebert, who had praised the double act of Connery and Caine in The Man Who Would Be King, praised Connery's chemistry with Hepburn, writing: "Connery and Hepburn seem to have arrived at a tacit understanding between themselves about their characters. They glow. They really do seem in love".

During the 1970s, Connery was part of ensemble casts in films such as Murder on the Orient Express (1974) with Vanessa Redgrave and John Gielgud, and played a British Army general in Richard Attenborough's war film A Bridge Too Far (1977), co-starring Dirk Bogarde and Laurence Olivier. In 1974, he starred in John Boorman's sci-fi thriller Zardoz. Often called one of the "weirdest and worst movies ever made" it featured Connery in a scarlet mankinia revealing costume which generated much controversy for its unBond-like appearance. Despite being panned by critics at the time, the film has developed a cult following since its release. In the audio commentary to the film, Boorman relates how Connery would write poetry in his free time, describing him as "a man of great depth and intelligence" and possessing the "most extraordinary memory". In 1981, Connery appeared in the film Time Bandits as Agamemnon. The casting choice derives from a joke Michael Palin included in the script, which describes the character's removing his mask and being "Sean Conneryor someone of equal but cheaper stature". When shown the script, Connery was happy to play the supporting role. In 1981 he portrayed Marshal William T. O'Niel in the science fiction thriller Outland. In 1982, Connery narrated G'olé!, the official film of the 1982 FIFA World Cup. That same year, he was offered the role of Daddy Warbucks in Annie, going as far as taking voice lessons for the John Huston musical before turning down the part.

Connery agreed to reprise Bond as an ageing agent 007 in Never Say Never Again, released in October 1983. The title, contributed by his wife, refers to his earlier statement that he would "never again" return to the role. Although the film performed well at the box office, it was plagued with production problems: strife between the director and producer, financial problems, the Fleming estate trustees' attempts to halt the film, and Connery's wrist being broken by the fight choreographer, Steven Seagal. As a result of his negative experiences during filming, Connery became unhappy with the major studios and did not make any films for two years. Following the successful European production The Name of the Rose (1986), for which he won a BAFTA Award for Best Actor, Connery's interest in more commercial material was revived. That same year, a supporting role in Highlander showcased his ability to play older mentors to younger leads, which became a recurring role in many of his later films.

In 1987, Connery starred in Brian De Palma's The Untouchables, where he played a hard-nosed Irish-American cop alongside Kevin Costner's Eliot Ness. The film also starred Charles Martin Smith, Patricia Clarkson, Andy Garcia, and Robert De Niro as Al Capone. The film was a critical and box-office success. Many critics praised Connery for his performance, including Roger Ebert, who wrote: "The best performance in the movie is Connery... [he] brings a human element to his character; he seems to have had an existence apart from the legend of the Untouchables, and when he's onscreen we can believe, briefly, that the Prohibition Era was inhabited by people, not caricatures". For his performance, Connery received the Academy Award for Best Supporting Actor.

Connery starred in Steven Spielberg's Indiana Jones and the Last Crusade (1989), playing Henry Jones, Sr., the title character's father, and received BAFTA and Golden Globe Award nominations. Harrison Ford said Connery's contributions at the writing stage enhanced the film. "It was amazing for me in how far he got into the script and went after exploiting opportunities for character. His suggestions to George [Lucas] at the writing stage really gave the character and the picture a lot more complexity and value than it had in the original screenplay". His subsequent box-office hits included The Hunt for Red October (1990), The Russia House (1990), The Rock (1996), and Entrapment (1999). In 1996, he voiced the role of Draco the dragon in the film Dragonheart. He also appeared in a brief cameo as King Richard the Lionheart at the end of Robin Hood: Prince of Thieves (1991). In 1998, Connery received the BAFTA Fellowship, a lifetime achievement award from the British Academy of Film and Television Arts.

Connery's later films included several box-office and critical disappointments such as First Knight (1995), Just Cause (1995), The Avengers (1998), and The League of Extraordinary Gentlemen (2003); however, he received positive reviews for his performance in Finding Forrester (2000). He also received a Crystal Globe for outstanding artistic contribution to world cinema. In a 2003 UK poll conducted by Channel 4, Connery was ranked eighth on their list of the 100 Greatest Movie Stars. The failure of The League of Extraordinary Gentlemen was especially frustrating for Connery. He sensed during shooting that the production was "going off the rails", and announced that the director, Stephen Norrington should be "locked up for insanity". Connery spent considerable effort in trying to salvage the film through the editing process, ultimately deciding to retire from acting rather than go through such stress ever again.

Connery turned down the role of Gandalf in The Lord of the Rings films, saying he did not understand the script. He was reportedly offered US$30 million along with 15% of the worldwide box office receipts, which would have earned him US$450 million. He also turned down the opportunity to appear as Albus Dumbledore in the Harry Potter series and the Architect in The Matrix trilogy. In 2005, he recorded voiceovers for the From Russia with Love video game with recording producer Terry Manning in the Bahamas, and provided his likeness. Connery said he was happy the producers, Electronic Arts, had approached him to voice Bond.

Retirement 

When Connery received the American Film Institute's Lifetime Achievement Award on 8 June 2006, he confirmed his retirement from acting. Connery's disillusionment with the "idiots now making films in Hollywood" was cited as a reason for his decision to retire. On 7 June 2007, he denied rumours that he would appear in the fourth Indiana Jones film, saying "retirement is just too much damned fun". In 2010, a bronze bust sculpture of Connery was placed in Tallinn, Estonia, outside The Scottish Club, whose membership includes Estonian Scotophiles and a handful of expatriate Scots. In 2012, Connery briefly came out of retirement to voice the title character in the Scottish animated film Sir Billi. Connery served as executive producer for an expanded 80-minute version.

Personal life 

During the production of South Pacific in the mid-1950s, Connery dated a Jewish "dark-haired beauty with a ballerina's figure", Carol Sopel, but was warned off by her family. He then dated Julie Hamilton, daughter of documentary filmmaker and feminist Jill Craigie. Given Connery's rugged appearance and rough charm, Hamilton initially thought he was an appalling person and was not attracted to him until she saw him in a kilt, declaring him to be the most beautiful thing she had ever seen in her life. He also shared a mutual attraction with jazz singer Maxine Daniels, whom he met whilst working in theatre. He made a pass at her, but she told him she was already happily married with a daughter.

Connery was married to actress Diane Cilento from 1962 to 1973, though they separated in 1971. They had a son, actor Jason Joseph. While they were separated, Connery dated Jill St. John, Lana Wood, Carole Mallory, and Magda Konopka. In her 2006 autobiography, Cilento alleged that he had abused her mentally and physically during their relationship. Connery cancelled an appearance at the Scottish Parliament in 2006 because of controversy over his alleged support of abuse of women. He denied claims he told Playboy magazine in 1965, "I don't think there is anything particularly wrong in hitting a woman, though I don't recommend you do it in the same way you hit a man". He was also reported to have stated to Vanity Fair in 1993, "There are women who take it to the wire. That's what they are looking for, the ultimate confrontation. They want a smack". In 2006, Connery told The Times of London, "I don't believe that any level of abuse of women is ever justified under any circumstances. Full stop".

Connery was married to French-Moroccan painter Micheline Roquebrune (born 4 April 1929) from 1975 until his death. The marriage survived a well-documented affair Connery had in the late 1980s with the singer and songwriter Lynsey de Paul, which she later regretted due to his views concerning domestic violence.

Connery owned the Domaine de Terre Blanche in the South of France from 1979. He sold it to German billionaire Dietmar Hopp in 1999. He was awarded an honorary rank of Shodan (1st dan) in Kyokushin karate. Connery relocated to the Bahamas in the 1990s; he owned a mansion in Lyford Cay on New Providence.

Connery was knighted by the Queen at an investiture ceremony at Holyrood Palace in Edinburgh on 5 July 2000. He had been nominated for a knighthood in 1997 and 1998, but these nominations were reportedly vetoed by Donald Dewar owing to Connery's political views. Connery had a villa in Kranidi, Greece. His neighbour was King Willem-Alexander of the Netherlands, with whom he shared a helicopter platform. Michael Caine (who co-starred with Connery in The Man Who Would Be King in 1975) was among Connery's closest friends.

Growing up, Connery supported the Scottish football club Celtic F.C., having been introduced to the club by his father who was a lifelong fan of the team. Later in life, Connery switched his loyalty to Celtic's bitter rival, Rangers F.C., after he became close friends with the team's chairman, David Murray. He was a keen golfer, introduced to the game by his friend Iain Stewart. English professional golfer Peter Alliss gave Connery golf lessons before the filming of the 1964 James Bond film Goldfinger, which involved a scene where Connery, as Bond, played golf against gold magnate Auric Goldfinger at Stoke Park Golf Club in Buckinghamshire. The golf scene saw him wear a Slazenger v-neck sweater, a brand which Connery became associated with while playing golf in his free time, with a light grey marl being a favoured colour. Record major championship winner and golf course designer Jack Nicklaus said, "He loved the game of golfSean was a pretty darn good golfer!and we played together several times. In May 1993, Sean and legendary driver Jackie Stewart helped me open our design of the PGA Centenary Course at Gleneagles in Scotland".

Political views 
Connery's Scottish roots and his experiences in filming in Glasgow's shipyards in 1966 inspired him to become a member of the centre-left Scottish National Party (SNP), which supports Scottish independence from the United Kingdom (in 2011, Connery said "The Bowler and the Bunnet was just the beginning of a journey that would lead to my long association with the Scottish National Party"). Connery supported the party both financially and through personal appearances. In 1967, he wrote to George Leslie, the SNP candidate in the 1967 Glasgow Pollok by-election, saying, "I am convinced that with our resources and skills we are more than capable of building a prosperous, vigorous and modern self-governing Scotland in which we can all take pride and which will deserve the respect of other nations." His funding of the SNP ceased in 2001, when the Parliament of the United Kingdom passed legislation prohibiting overseas funding of political activities in the United Kingdom.

Tax status 
In response to accusations that he was a tax exile, Connery released documents in 2003 showing he had paid £3.7 million in UK taxes between 1997 and 1998 and between 2002 and 2003; critics pointed out that had he been continuously residing in the UK for tax purposes, his tax rate would have been far higher. In the run-up to the 2014 Scottish independence referendum, Connery's brother Neil said Connery would not come to Scotland to rally independence supporters, since his tax exile status greatly limited the number of days he could spend in the country.

After Connery sold his Marbella villa in 1999, Spanish authorities launched a tax evasion investigation, alleging that the Spanish treasury had been defrauded of £5.5 million. Connery was subsequently cleared by officials, but his wife and 16 others were charged with attempting to defraud the Spanish treasury.

Death and legacy 
Connery died in his sleep on 31 October 2020, aged 90, at his home in the Lyford Cay community of Nassau in the Bahamas. His death was announced by his family and Eon Productions; although they did not disclose the cause of death, his son Jason said he had been unwell for some time. A day later, Roquebrune revealed he had dementia in his final years. Connery's death certificate was obtained by TMZ a month after his death, showing the cause of death was pneumonia and cardiopulmonary failure, and the time of death was listed as 1:30 am. He was cremated after his death, and his ashes were scattered in Scotland at undisclosed locations in 2022.

Following the announcement of his death, many co-stars and figures from the entertainment industry paid tribute to Connery, including Sam Neill, Nicolas Cage, Robert De Niro, Michael Bay, Tippi Hedren, Alec Baldwin, Hugh Jackman, George Lucas, Shirley Bassey, Kevin Costner, Catherine Zeta-Jones, Barbra Streisand, John Cleese, Jane Seymour and Harrison Ford, as well as former Bond stars George Lazenby, Timothy Dalton and Pierce Brosnan, the family of late former Bond actor Roger Moore, and Daniel Craig, who played 007 until No Time to Die. Connery's longtime friend Michael Caine called him a "great star, brilliant actor and a wonderful friend". James Bond producers Michael G. Wilson and Barbara Broccoli released a statement saying Connery had "revolutionized the world with his gritty and witty portrayal of the sexy and charismatic secret agent. He is undoubtedly largely responsible for the success of the film series and we shall be forever grateful to him".

In 2004, a poll in the UK Sunday Herald recognised Connery as "The Greatest Living Scot" and a 2011 EuroMillions survey named him "Scotland's Greatest Living National Treasure". He was voted by People magazine as the "Sexiest Man Alive" in 1989 and the "Sexiest Man of the Century" in 1999.

Filmography

Awards and honours 

Honours
 1987: Commander of the Order of Arts and Letters from France
 1998: British Academy Film Fellowship
 1999: Kennedy Center Honors
 2000: Received Knighthood from Queen Elizabeth II
 2005: European Film Awards Lifetime Achievement Award
 2006: AFI Life Achievement Award

References

Bibliography

External links 

 
 
 Sean Connery at the British Film Institute
 
 
 
 

20th-century Royal Navy personnel
20th-century Scottish male actors
21st-century Scottish male actors
1930 births
2020 deaths
Actors awarded knighthoods
AFI Life Achievement Award recipients
Association football midfielders
BAFTA fellows
Best Actor BAFTA Award winners
Best Supporting Actor Academy Award winners
Best Supporting Actor Golden Globe (film) winners
Bonnyrigg Rose Athletic F.C. players
British expatriates in the Bahamas
Cecil B. DeMille Award Golden Globe winners
Chevaliers of the Légion d'honneur
Commandeurs of the Ordre des Arts et des Lettres
European Film Awards winners (people)
Kennedy Center honorees
Knights Bachelor
Kyokushin kaikan practitioners
Male actors from Edinburgh
Military personnel from Edinburgh
Royal Navy sailors
Scottish film producers
Scottish footballers
Scottish male film actors
Scottish male stage actors
Scottish male television actors
Scottish male voice actors
Deaths from pneumonia in the Bahamas
People with dementia
Scottish nationalists
Scottish people of Irish descent
Violence against women in the United Kingdom